AccessBank Liberia (ABL), is a  microfinance commercial bank in Liberia. It is one of the commercial banks licensed by the Central Bank of Liberia, the national banking regulator.

Overview
The bank is Liberia's first licensed microfinance services provider. They obtained a commercial banking licence in January 2009, according to the website of the Central Bank of Liberia. , the shareholders' equity in the bank is valued at US$11.783 million (EUR:8.9 million), with US$11 million  in customer deposits and over 50,000 customers.

Ownership
The bank's stock is owned by the following corporate entities:

About the shareholders

AccessHolding
Access Microfinance Holding AG (AccessHolding) is a commercial microfinance holding company. Its business purpose is to invest in microfinance institutions (MFIs) and to develop these investments through a combination of equity finance, holding services, and management assistance. These services are rendered by its technical partner and founding shareholder LFS Financial Systems GmbH, with which AccessHolding shares premises in Berlin, Germany.

AccessHolding establishes new MFIs together with other partners, and transforms existing non-bank microlending institutions into full-service microfinance banks. Currently, there are 10 AccessBanks operating in Azerbaijan, Liberia, Madagascar, Nigeria, Tanzania, Zambia, Tajikistan, Rwanda, Georgia and Brazil.

LFS Financial Systems
LFS Financial Systems not only builds up and manages all network banks but also provides them with central support in a variety of operative areas, including key risk management functions. Active cooperation in areas such as training or product development, particularly within regional clusters, exhibits further potential for synergies and other efficiency gains. AccessHolding’s shareholders, aside from LFS, are the International Finance Corporation, the German development bank KfW, the European Investment Bank, the UK development fund CDC Group Plc., the US Tufts University Omidyar-Tufts Microfinance Fund, and MicroAssets GbR, a fund of LFS employees and other interested individuals.

International Finance Corporation
The International Finance Corporation (IFC) is a member of the World Bank Group, its primary mission being to foster and encourage private sector investment in developing and transition countries. Based in Washington DC, IFC has been a major driving force behind the development of microfinance industries in virtually all developing regions, and has long-standing experience as an investor in commercial microfinance institutions. IFC has country or regional offices across Africa, including an office in Monrovia.

IFC is a shareholder of AccessHolding and a co-investor in most of AccessHolding’s network banks. It is also providing technical assistance and debt funding to some of the banks.

African Development Bank
The African Development Bank (AfDB) was established in 1964 with the intention of promoting economic and social development in Africa. The bank is a conglomeration of the African Development Bank (AfDB), the African Development Fund (ADF), and the Nigeria Trust Fund (NTF). It currently has 77 members: 53 countries in Africa and 24 in America, Europe and Asia. Over the past years it has strengthened its involvement in private sector development-related projects in general, and its exposure to microfinance in particular.  AfDB is a partner of AccessHolding.

The European Investment Bank
The European Investment Bank was created by the Treaty of Rome in 1958 as the long-term lending bank of the European Union. The task of the Bank is to contribute towards the integration, balanced development and economic and social cohesion of the EU Member States. The EIB raises substantial volumes of funds on the capital markets which it lends to projects furthering EU policy objectives. It operates in keeping with strict banking practice and in close collaboration with the wider banking community, both when borrowing on the capital markets and when financing capital projects.
As a shareholder of AccessHolding, the EIB has been closely involved in the build-up of the emerging AccessBank network in Africa and elsewhere.

Branch Network
, AccessBank Liberia operates 7 branches, including at these locations:

 Head Office, 20th Street, Sinkor Monrovia
 Johnson Street Branch, Ashmun & Johnson Streets Intersection, Monrovia
 Paynesville Branch, Paynesville, Redlight, Monrovia
 Duala Branch, Caldwell Junction, Monrovia
 Sinkor Branch, 20th Street, Sinkor, Monrovia
 Gardnersville Branch, Somalia Drive, Monrovia
 Buchanan Branch, Buchanan, Liberia, Grand Bassa County, Liberia
 ELWA Branch, Robertsfield Highway / Dilon Avenue junction, ELWA, Monrovia, Liberia

See also

 Economy of Liberia
 List of banks in Liberia

References

External links
 Original Shareholding In AccessBank Liberia In 2008

Banks of Liberia
Banks established in 2009
Companies based in Monrovia
2009 establishments in Liberia